La ricerca della lingua perfetta nella cultura europea (The Search for the Perfect Language (the Making of Europe); trans. James Fentress) is a 1993 book by Umberto Eco about attempts to devise an ideal language. The writing is essayistic and uses the myth of Babel as a paradigm for connecting linguistic and social practices. Emphasizing that the quest for a perfect language has never been devoid of ideological motivation, Eco outlines some objections to the idea and suggests that an International Auxiliary Language, such as Esperanto, is a more realistic project. He points out that the impossible quest has had some useful side effects (taxonomy, scientific notations etc.) but dwells mostly on exotic proposals. Lengthy passages are devoted to Dante, Lull, Kircher, various 17th century authors and a few less well-known names from later times. The contemporary project for a politically and culturally unified Europe provides the perspective for a more serious consideration of the theme.

Contents

From Adam to Confusio Linguarum
The Kabbalistic pansemioticism
The perfect language of Dante
The Ars Magna of Raymond Lull
The Monogenetic Hypothesis and the Mother Tongues
Kabbalism and Lullism in Modern Culture
The Perfect language of Images
Magic language
Polygraphies
'A priori' philosophical languages
George Dalgarno
John Wilkins
Francis Lodwick
From Leibniz to the Encyclopédie
Philosophical Language from the Enlightenment to Today
The International Auxiliary Languages
Conclusion

English Editions
 Blackwell Publishing Limited (1995) .
 Fontana Press (1997), .

External links
 A review by David Crystal 

1993 essays
Italian essays
Linguistics books